The 1946 All-SEC football team consists of American football players selected to the All-Southeastern Conference (SEC) chosen by various selectors for the 1946 college football season. Georgia and Tennessee shared the conference title.

All-SEC selections

Ends
Ray Poole, Ole Miss (AP, UP-1)
Wallace Jones, Kentucky (AP, UP-3)
Broughton Williams, Florida (UP-1)
Bill Hildebrand, Miss. St. (UP-2)
Josh North, Vanderbilt (UP-2)
Jim Powell, Tennessee (UP-3)

Tackles
Dick Huffman, Tennessee (AP, UP-1)
Bob Davis, Georgia Tech (AP, UP-2)
Al Sidorik, Miss. St. (UP-1)
Walter Barnes, LSU (UP-2)
Alf Satterfield, Vanderbilt (UP-3)
Charley Compton, Alabama (UP-3)

Guards
Herbert St. John, Georgia  (AP, UP-1)
Wren Worley, LSU (AP, UP-2)
Bill Healy, Georgia Tech (UP-1)
Gaston Bourgeois, Tulane (UP-2)
Mike Mihalic, Miss. St. (UP-3)
Ray Drost, Tennessee (UP-3)

Centers
Paul Duke, Georgia Tech (AP, UP-1)
Vaughn Mancha, Alabama (College Football Hall of Fame)  (UP-2)
Elbert Corley, Miss. St. (UP-3)

Quarterbacks
Frank Broyles, Georgia Tech (AP, UP-2)
Y. A. Tittle, LSU (UP-1)
John Rauch, Georgia (College Football Hall of Fame) (UP-3)

Halfbacks
Harry Gilmer, Alabama (College Football Hall of Fame)  (AP, UP-1)
Shorty McWilliams, Miss. St. (AP, UP-3)
Charlie Conerly, Ole Miss (College Football Hall of Fame)  (UP-1)
Travis Tidwell, Auburn (UP-2)
Dan Phelps, Kentucky (UP-2)
Walter Slater, Tennessee (UP-3)

Fullbacks
Charley Trippi, Georgia (College Football Hall of Fame)  (AP, UP-1)
Gene Knight, LSU (UP-2)
George Mathews, Georgia Tech (UP-3)

Key

AP = Associated Press

UP = United Press.

Bold = Consensus first-team selection by both AP and UP

See also
1946 College Football All-America Team

References

All-SEC
All-SEC football teams